Kenneth "Ken" David Bowman (6 March 1937 – 10 October 2013) was an English professional rugby league footballer who played in the 1950s and 1960s.

Early life
Bowman was born in Great Ouseburn, Harrogate, West Riding of Yorkshire, and attended Fishergate Primary School. He began playing rugby league at school and for Heworth before turning professional in April 1955, aged 17, to sign for Huddersfield.

Playing career

International honours
Ken Bowman won caps for Great Britain while at Huddersfield in 1962 against France, and in 1963 against France, and Australia.

Challenge Cup Final appearances
Ken Bowman played right-, i.e. number 12, in Huddersfield's 6-12 defeat by Wakefield Trinity in the 1961–62 Challenge Cup Final during the 1961–62 season at Wembley Stadium, London on Saturday 12 May 1962, in front of a crowd of 81,263.

County Cup Final appearances
Ken Bowman played right-, i.e. number 12, and scored a try in Huddersfield's 15-8 victory over York in the 1957–58 Yorkshire County Cup Final during the 1957–58 season at Headingley Rugby Stadium, Leeds on Saturday 19 October 1957, and played right- in the 10-16 defeat by Wakefield Trinity in the 1960–61 Yorkshire County Cup Final during the 1960–61 season at Headingley Rugby Stadium, Leeds on Saturday 29 October 1960.

Testimonial match
Ken Bowman's Testimonial match at Huddersfield took place in 1965. He made 247 appearances for the club before transferring to Bradford Northern in September 1965.

Personal life
Bowman married his wife, Beryl, in 1957, with whom he had two sons, Chris and Paul. He was a salesman and later a sales manager at Leyland Paints, later named Kalon Group PLC, he moved to the Wirral in 1977, he retired from work in 2002. He was captain of Bromborough Golf Club, a regular church goer. Ken was an active Freemason and a member of Noctorum Lodge 5913. He died aged 76 in Bromborough, Cheshire, England.

References

External links
Great Britain Statistics at englandrl.co.uk (statistics currently missing due to not having appeared for both Great Britain, and England)

1937 births
2013 deaths
Bradford Bulls players
English rugby league players
Great Britain national rugby league team players
Huddersfield Giants players
Rugby league players from Harrogate
Rugby league second-rows
Rugby league wingers